Dizmar-e Sharqi Rural District is in Minjavan District of Khoda Afarin County, East Azerbaijan province, Iran. At the National Census of 2006, its population was 2,888 in 641 households. There were 3,097 inhabitants in 865 households at the following census of 2011. At the most recent census of 2016, the population of the rural district was 2,760 in 867 households. The largest of its 22 villages was Marzabad, with 742 people.

History
Dizmar was first mentioned by the renowned historian Hamdallah Mustawfi in the mid-fourteenth century, "Dizmar is a district in the north of Tabriz which includes more than 50 villages ..."   Mardanaqom, was also mentioned by Hamdallah Mustawfi as a thriving village. The landmark, manifesting ancient history of the district, is an ancient plane tree in Kavanaq village (included on the map). The tree is about 3 meter in diameter and is said to have lived for 500 years. Moreover, on a mountain between Kavanaq and Mardanaqom, there is a castle dating from Sasanian era. It was used as a jail for high-ranking officials during Khwarazmian reign.

In the wake of White Revolution (early 1960s) many clans of Qarāca Dāġ tribes used Dizmar  as their winter quarters. The eastern part of Dizmar was declared a part of Khoda Afarin County in 2011 and Mardanaqom was designated as its capital.

References 

Khoda Afarin County

Rural Districts of East Azerbaijan Province

Populated places in East Azerbaijan Province

Populated places in Khoda Afarin County